YSK may refer to:

 Sanikiluaq Airport (IATA airport code)
 Supreme Electoral Council of Turkey (Yüksek Seçim Kurulu)